Myrmeleotettix is a genus of grasshopper in the tribe Gomphocerini.  Species are recorded from western Europe and throughout temperate Asia.

Species
, the genus consists of the following species:

 Myrmeleotettix angustiseptus 
 Myrmeleotettix antennatus 
 Myrmeleotettix brachypterus 
 Myrmeleotettix ethicus 
 Myrmeleotettix kunlunensis 
 Myrmeleotettix longipennis 
 Myrmeleotettix maculatus 
 Myrmeleotettix pallidus 
 Myrmeleotettix palpalis 
 Myrmeleotettix pluridentis 
 Myrmeleotettix zaitzevi

References

Further reading

 

Acrididae genera
Taxa named by Ignacio Bolívar
Gomphocerinae